George Arthur Wynn (14 October 1886 – 28 October 1966) was a Welsh professional footballer who played as a forward or as a half back for Oswestry United, Wrexham, Manchester City, Coventry City and Halifax Town. He also won 12 caps for Wales. He had a record of being an accomplished finisher in and around the box, his seasons' tallies laying claim to that.

Career 
Wynn made his footballing debut for Oswestry United in 1906 and scored in the final as the club lifted the Welsh Cup in 1906.

Within weeks of the Welsh Cup final, Wynn had been snapped up by Wrexham, who were playing in the Football Combination at the time. Whilst at Wrexham, Wynn made his international debut on 1 March 1909 in a Home Championship match against Scotland at The Racecourse, Wrexham, which Wales won 3–2. He scored his only international goal in a 3–2 victory over Ireland, also at The Racecourse. Several league clubs were believed to be interested in signing Wynn, and in May 1909, he moved to Manchester City for £250.

Wynn made his Manchester City debut on Christmas Day 1909 in a 2–0 defeat to Bradford Park Avenue. He scored his first goal for the club two days later against Grimsby Town. In the 1909–10 season he scored 12 goals in 24 appearances as Manchester City won the Second Division championship. In each of the next three seasons he was the club's leading goalscorer with 9, 18 and 16 goals respectively. The onset of World War I shortened Wynn's playing career. His final game for Manchester City came shortly after the resumption of competitive football, in a match against Oldham Athletic on 8 September 1919. In total he made 127 appearances for the club, scoring 60 goals.

Having appeared for Wales in both Victory internationals – unofficial international matches between Wales and England to mark the end of World War I – Wynn was sold to Coventry City for £300. At Coventry he made a total of 27 appearances in two seasons. He made a solitary appearance for Halifax Town before bringing his career to an end with Cheshire League side Mossley.

Internationally he was capped a total of 12 times by Wales and was a prominent figure for the national team during the pre-Great War period. He was one of the key members of the XI alongside former Manchester City team-mate and legend Billy Meredith.

Personal life 
Wynn served as a private in the Lancashire Fusiliers and the Lincolnshire Regiment during the First World War. In 1918, he was shot in the left leg and received wounds from a shell burst.

Career statistics

References 

 
 

Welsh footballers
Wales international footballers
Coventry City F.C. players
Halifax Town A.F.C. players
Manchester City F.C. players
Wrexham A.F.C. players
1886 births
1966 deaths
English Football League players
Association football inside forwards
Chirk AAA F.C. players
Oswestry United F.C. players
Llandudno F.C. players
Mansfield Town F.C. players
Mossley A.F.C. players
Military personnel from Shropshire
British Army personnel of World War I
Royal Lincolnshire Regiment soldiers
Lancashire Fusiliers soldiers
Sportspeople from Shropshire
British shooting survivors